This was a new event to the ITF Women's Circuit in 2011.

Nathalie Piquion won the title, defeating qualifier Doroteja Erić in the final, 6–3, 3–6, 6–1.

Seeds

Draw

Finals

Top half

Bottom half

External Links
 Main draw
 Qualifying draw

Zagreb Open - Singles